Nelken is a German-language surname. Notable people with this surname include:

 Carmen Eva Nelken Mansberger (1898 – 1966), known by the pseudonym Magda Donato, a Spanish writer, journalist, playwright, and actress
David Nelken, law professor
Hank Nelken, American screenwriter
Margarita Nelken  (1894–1968), Spanish feminist and writer
Shane Nelken, Canadian singer-songwriter

See also

German-language surnames